Fernando Zunzunegui Rodríguez (5 October 1943 – 28 August 2014) was a Spanish footballer, who played as a defender.

Career
A native of Vigo, Zunzunegui began playing youth football with local side Chao. Soon he joined Celta de Vigo's B team (then known as Turista) before moving up to play for Celta's senior side. After impressing in 63 official matches with Celta, Zunzunegui joined Real Madrid in 1965. However, he was required to perform military service in Laayoune, Spanish Sahara and missed out on Real Madrid's 1965–66 European Cup triumph. After completing his military service, Zunzunegui re-joined Real Madrid, winning La Liga four times and the Copa del Rey once. He made 112 official appearances for Real Madrid over seven seasons, before leaving for UD Levante.

Honours
Real Madrid
 4 Spanish League: 1966–67, 1967–68, 1968–69, 1971–72
Spanish Cup: 1969–70

References

External links
 
 Celta de Vigo profile 

1943 births
2014 deaths
Footballers from Vigo
Spanish footballers
Association football defenders
La Liga players
RC Celta de Vigo players
Real Madrid CF players
Levante UD footballers
Spain youth international footballers